The Roman Catholic Diocese of San Felipe is a diocese located in the city of San Felipe in the Ecclesiastical province of Santiago de Chile in Chile. The diocese was led by an apostolic administrator, Jaime Ortiz de Lazcano Piquer, from 21 September 2018 (when Pope Francis accepted the resignation of Bishop Cristián Contreras Molina, whom the Vatican had found innocent of charges of sexual abuse and who had had civil charges dropped for lack of evidence.) until 26 May 2020, when Gonzalo Arturo Bravo Álvarez was appointed the new Bishop (consecrated and installed on 13 August).

History
 18 October 1925: Established as Diocese of San Felipe from the Metropolitan Archdiocese of Santiago de Chile

Leadership
 Bishops of San Felipe (Roman Rite), in reverse chronological order
 Bishop Gonzalo Arturo Bravo Álvarez (May 26, 2020 – present)
 Bishop Cristián Contreras Molina, O. de M. (July 19, 2002 – September 21, 2018)
 Bishop Manuel Camilo Vial Risopatrón (December 20, 1983 – September 21, 2001), appointed Bishop of Temuco
 Archbishop (personal title) Francisco de Borja Valenzuela Ríos (March 25, 1974 – May 3, 1983), appointed Archbishop (personal title) of Valparaíso
 Bishop Enrique Alvear Urrutia (June 7, 1965  – February 9, 1974)
 Bishop José Luis Castro Cabrera (May 10, 1963 – January 26, 1965)
 Bishop Ramón Munita Eyzaguirre (November 23, 1957 – April 23, 1963)
 Bishop Roberto Benardino Berríos Gaínza, O.F.M. (March 19, 1938 – November 23, 1957)
 Bishop Melquisedec del Canto Terán (December 14, 1925 – March 19, 1938)

References

Sources
 GCatholic.org
 Catholic Hierarchy
  Diocese website

Roman Catholic dioceses in Chile
Christian organizations established in 1925
Roman Catholic dioceses and prelatures established in the 20th century
San Felipe, Roman Catholic Diocese of
1925 establishments in Chile